S. nobilis may refer to:
 Sphenopsalis nobilis, an extinct mammal species from the Paleocene of Central Asia
 Steatoda nobilis, the biting spider or false black widow, a spider species

Synonyms
 Stapelia nobilis, a synonym for Stapelia gigantea, a plant species

See also
 Nobilis (disambiguation)